The 1988–89 season was the 74th season of the Isthmian League, which is an English football competition featuring semi-professional and amateur clubs from London, East and South East England. 

The league consisted of three divisions. Division Two was divided into two sections.

Leytonstone/Ilford were 1989 champions, winning their first Isthmian League title after renaming in 1983. In the summer of 1988, Oxford City had left the league after losing its ground. Also in the summer of 1988, Walthamstow Avenue merged into Leytonstone/Ilford: the new club regained Leytonstone/Ilford's name and place in the Premier Division.

Premier Division

The Premier Division consisted of 22 clubs, including 19 clubs from the previous season and three new clubs:
 Dagenham, relegated from the Football Conference
 Grays Athletic, promoted as champions of Division One
 Marlow, promoted as runners-up in Division One

At the end of the previous season First Division club Walthamstow Avenue merged into Leytonstone/Ilford. The new club started next season in the Premier Division under the name of the Premier Division club.

At the end of the season Leytonstone/Ilford were refused in promotion due to ground problems. The club changed its name into Redbridge Forest before the next season started.

Farnborough Town finished second and were promoted back to the Conference after four years in the Isthmian League.

League table

Division One

Division One consisted of 21 clubs, including 15 clubs from the previous season and six new clubs:

Two clubs relegated from the Premier Division:
 Basingstoke Town
 Hitchin Town

Two clubs promoted from Division Two North:
 Collier Row
 Wivenhoe Town

Two clubs promoted from Division Two South:
 Chalfont St Peter
 Metropolitan Police

Division One started the season one club short after Oxford City left the league after losing its ground, and Walthamstow Avenue merged into Leytonstone/Ilford at the end of the previous season.

League table

Division Two North

Division Two North consisted of 22 clubs, including 18 clubs from the previous season and four new clubs:

 Billericay Town, relegated from Division One
 Purfleet, joined from the Essex Senior League
 Stevenage Borough, relegated from Division One
 Wolverton Town, relegated from Division One

League table

Division Two South

Division Two South consisted of 21 clubs, including 20 clubs from the previous season and one new club:

 Finchley, transferred from Division Two North

League table

See also
Isthmian League
1988–89 Northern Premier League
1988–89 Southern Football League

References

Isthmian League seasons
6